Ebenezer Seaver (July 5, 1763 – March 1, 1844) was a U.S. Representative from Massachusetts.

Born in Roxbury in the Province of Massachusetts Bay, Seaver graduated from Harvard University in 1784.
He engaged in agricultural pursuits.
He served as member of the State house of representatives 1794–1802.

Seaver was elected as a Democratic-Republican to the Eighth and to the four succeeding Congresses (March 4, 1803 – March 3, 1813).
He was an unsuccessful candidate for reelection in 1812 to the Thirteenth Congress.
He served as member of the State constitutional convention in 1820.
He was again a member of the State house of representatives in 1822, 1823, and 1826.
He died in Roxbury, Massachusetts, March 1, 1844.

External links

1763 births
1844 deaths
Harvard University alumni
Members of the Massachusetts House of Representatives
Democratic-Republican Party members of the United States House of Representatives from Massachusetts